Kilbirnie Ladeside Football Club are a Scottish football club, from Kilbirnie, North Ayrshire. Based at Valefield Park, they currently play in the West of Scotland Football League. Their main rivals are Beith Juniors. The club nickname, The Blasties, derives from a Robert Burns poem, The Inventory, written in 1786.

West of Scotland League 
In 2020, Kilbirnie moved from the SJFA, to join the pyramid system in Scottish football as one of the inaugural members of the West of Scotland Football League.

On 10 October 2020, the club announced they would not be participating in the inaugural season of the West of Scotland League due to concerns relating to the COVID-19 pandemic, citing the inability of fans to be able to attend games as a huge issue for the club.

Valefield Park

Valefield Park is home to Kilbirnie Ladeside. The average attendance is around two hundred (varying for cup games).

History
The Blasties (the nickname of Kilbirnie Ladeside) original home of Ladeside Park on Mill Road was partly built on by the army during World War II and the club relocated to Valefield, the home of Glengarnock Vale, another local side. Vale did not re-appear after the war and Valefield Park became Ladeside's permanent ground. The name 'Ladeside' derives from the lade that runs near the ground from the old Nether Mill at Knoxsville Road near the Miller's Knowe.

Structure
Although the ground is small it can comfortably hold up to six hundred spectators. On the north-west side there are two main stands which were both constructed at the start of the new millennium. The ground has around four main turnstiles, two of which are located on Kirkland Road. There is a small snack bar offering a wide range of hot and cold food and a licensed bar located on the south east corner welcoming both home and away support.

Current squad
As of 28 September 2020

Club staff

Honours
Scottish Junior Cup
 Winners: 1951–52, 1976–77
 Runners-up: 1986–87

Other honours
 West of Scotland Cup winners: 2007–08
 Scottish Junior League winners: 1903–04
 Ayrshire League champions: 1975–76
 Western League champions: 1947–48, 1949–50, 1951–52, 1967–68
 Ayrshire Cup: 1912–13, 1923–24, 1947–48, 1949–50, 1971–72, 1974–75, 1975–76, 1986–87
 Western/Ayrshire League Cup winners: 1923–24, 1931–32, 1938–39, 1988–89, 1994–95, 2009–10, 2016–17

Notable former players

George Stevenson, Motherwell and Scotland.
Ernie McGarr, Aberdeen and Scotland.

References

External links
 Official site
 Facebook
 Twitter

Football clubs in Scotland
Scottish Junior Football Association clubs
Association football clubs established in 1901
Football in North Ayrshire
1901 establishments in Scotland
West of Scotland Football League teams
Garnock Valley
Kilbirnie Ladeside F.C.